The Indraprastha Metro Station is located on the Blue Line of the Delhi Metro.

Station layout

Facilities 
List of available ATM at Indraprastha metro station: State Bank of India, Canara Bank.

See also
List of Delhi Metro stations
Transport in Delhi

References

External links

 Delhi Metro Rail Corporation Ltd. (Official site) 
 Delhi Metro Annual Reports
 

Delhi Metro stations
Railway stations opened in 2006
2006 establishments in Delhi
Railway stations in Central Delhi district